Riaan Oosthuizen (born 3 May 1972) is a South African cricketer. He played in six first-class and four List A matches from 1991/92 to 1996/97.

References

External links
 

1972 births
Living people
South African cricketers
Boland cricketers
Western Province cricketers
Sportspeople from Cape Town